The following is a list of notable deaths in September 2000.

Entries for each day are listed alphabetically by surname. A typical entry lists information in the following sequence:
 Name, age, country of citizenship at birth, subsequent country of citizenship (if applicable), reason for notability, cause of death (if known), and reference.

September 2000

1
Olavi Ahonen, 77, Finnish film actor and comedian.
Barbara Brooke, Baroness Brooke of Ystradfellte, 92, British politician.
Dee Caperton Kessel, 57, American politician and Miss West Virginia.
Alexander Rhea, 81, American industrialist.

2
Ishaq Bux, 83, Indian actor.
Heinz Harmel, 94, German SS commander during World War II.
Jean Speegle Howard, 73, American actress.
Elvera Sanchez, 95, American dancer.
Jafar Shafaghat, Iranian Army officer and Minister of Defense.
Curt Siodmak, 98, German-American novelist and screenwriter (The Wolf Man, Donovan's Brain).
Gennady Smirnov, 45, Russian footballer.
Audrey Wise, 68, British politician.

3
Richard W. Abbe, 74, American jurist (Associate Justice of the California Second District Court of Appeal, Division Six).
Edward Anhalt, 86, American screenwriter and filmmaker (winner of 1950 Academy Award for Best Story for Panic in the Streets).
R. H. Harris, 84, American gospel singer (Soul Stirrers).
Jack Simmons, 85, British transport historian.
Walt Stanchfield, 81, American animator (Walt Disney Studios).
Clyde Sukeforth, 98, American baseball player.

4
Sir John Beith, 86, British diplomat.
David Brown, 53, American bass guitarist (Santana).
Pinky May, 89, American baseball player.
Mihály Mayer, 66, Hungarian water polo player, Olympic champion (1964).
Mukri, 78, Indian film actor.
Mary Shepard, 90, English illustrator of children's books.

5
Carlo M. Cipolla, 78, Italian economic historian.
Roy Fredericks, 57, West Indian cricketer, cancer.
George Musso, 90, American football player (Chicago Bears) and member of the Pro Football Hall of Fame.
Abdul Haris Nasution, 81, Indonesian general.

6
Kees van Aelst, 83, Dutch water polo player and Olympian (1936 Summer Olympics).
Richard Baum, 98, German musicologist.
David E. Bell, 81, American public servant, director of the U.S. Office of Management and Budget (1961–1962).
Jiří Sovák, 79, Czech actor.
Desmond Wilcox, 69, British journalist and television producer.

7
Bruce Gyngell, 71, Australian television executive, cancer-related illness.
Gian Luigi Polidoro, 73, Italian film director and screenwriter.
Nick Tremark, 87, American baseball player.
George Wright, 70, English footballer.

8
Carlos Castillo Peraza, 53, Mexican politician.
Yves Gaucher, 66, Canadian abstract painter and printmaker.
Otto K. Lind, 79, Danish resistance fighter and general.
István Moldován, 88, Hungarian painter and graphic artist.
R.L. Peteni, 84, Xhosa South African novelist, academic, and author.
Raul Roulien, 94, Brazilian actor, singer, and film director.

9
Sir Julian Critchley, 69, British politician.
Takashi Fukutani, 48, Japanese manga artist, pulmonary edema.
Veerasamy Ringadoo, 79, Mauritian politician, minister and Governor-General of Mauritius.
Peter Robinson, 78, English footballer.
Robert S. Stevens, American politician and jurist.
Bill Waddington, 84, English music hall performer, actor, and comedian.

10
Jakie Astor, 82, English politician and sportsman.
Paolo Gislimberti, 33, Italian volunteer firefighter and youth coach, racing accident.
Zaib-un-Nissa Hamidullah, 81, Pakistani writer and journalist.
Chandra Khonnokyoong, 91, Thai Maechi.
William Nierenberg, 81, American physicist and member of the Manhattan Project.
Ben Wicks, 73, British-Canadian cartoonist, illustrator, journalist, and author, cancer.

11
Peter Browne, 76, Australian politician.
Joe Dale, 79, English footballer.
Willard A. Downes, 91, American artist and illustrator.
Philipp Fehl, 80, Austrian  artist and art historian.
Harry Gould, 86, Welsh professional golfer.
Martin James Monti, 78, US Army Air Force pilot.
William Wilson Quinn, 92, US Army officer.
Myron Spaulding, 94, American sailor, yacht designer and concert violinist.

12
Sevil Hajiyeva, 31, Azerbaijani singer, shot.
Konrad Kujau, 62, German illustrator and forger, cancer.
Gary Olsen, 42, English actor, cancer.
Stanley Turrentine, 66, American jazz tenor saxophonist.

13
Betty Jeffrey, 92, Australian writer.
Duane Swanson, 87, American basketball player.
Thurman "Fum" McGraw, 73, American football player.
Howard Johnson, 89, British politician.

14
Hamad Al-Jassir, Saudi Arabian journalist and historian.
Françoise Brauner, 89, Austrian-French pediatrician, child psychiatrist and resistance member during World War II.
George Christopher, 92, Greek-American politician.
Frederick Erroll, 1st Baron Erroll of Hale, 86, British politician.
Jerzy Giedroyc, 94, Polish writer and political activist.
Cheng Kejie, 66, Chinese government official, executed.
George Myatt, 86, American baseball player.
Beah Richards, 80, American actress (Guess Who's Coming to Dinner).

15
David Flusser, 83, Israeli professor of Early Christianity.
Jennifer Gan, 62, American actress.
Zanvyl Krieger, 94, American businessman and philanthropist.
Jean Yancey, 86, American entrepreneur and motivational speaker, heart failure.

16
M. H. M. Ashraff, 51, Sri Lankan lawyer and politician, helicopter crash.
Şükriye Dikmen, Turkish painter.
Georgiy Gongadze, 31, Ukrainian journalist.
Joseph C. Howard Sr., 77, American judge.
John Perkovich, 76, American baseball player.
Alexandra Petrova, 19, Russian model and beauty pageant contestant, murdered.
Dharma Vira, 94, Indian politician.

17
Dem Rădulescu, 68, Romanian actor.
Nicole Reinhart, 24, American cyclist.
Chico Salmon, 59, Panamanian baseball player.
Sir Philip Woodfield, 77, British civil servant.
Paula Yates, 41, British television presenter and journalist, drug overdose.

18
Glyde Butler, 68, Australian politician.
Gilbert Carpentier, 80, French television show producer.
Dawn Langley Simmons, 77, English author and biographer, Parkinson's disease.
Chen Yuefang, 37,  Chinese basketball player.

19
Ann Doran, 89, American character actress.
Gordon V. Frederick, 76, American politician.
Humphrey Gould, 73, New Zealand rower.
Anthony Robert Klitz, 83, British artist.
Karl Robatsch, 70, Austrian chess player and botanist, cancer.
Gloria Talbott, 69, American actress, kidney failure.

20
Sururi Gümen, 80, Turkish-born American illustrator.
Kimweri Mputa Magogo, Tanzania traditional leader.
Mona Moore, 83, British painter and illustrator.
Stanislav Stratiev, 59, Bulgarian playwright.
Gherman Titov, 65, Soviet cosmonaut.

21
Robert Wright Campbell, 73, American author and scriptwriter.
Robert Peterson, 76, American poet.
John Egerton, 6th Duke of Sutherland, 85, British aristocrat.

22
Yehuda Amichai, 76, Israeli poet.
Sir Antony Read, 87, British Army general.
Saburō Sakai, 84, Japanese flying ace during World War II.
Bill Sommers, 77, American baseball player.

23
Janice Biala, 97, Polish-born American painter.
John Laffin, 78, Australian military historian.
Václav Migas, 56,  Czech international footballer.
Aurelio Rodríguez, 52, Mexican Major League Baseball player, traffic accident.
Carl Rowan, 75, American government official, journalist and author.
Kenny Smith, 76, Canadian ice hockey player.
Ursula Wendorff-Weidt, 81, German artist and illustrator.

24
Dorr Bothwell, 98, American artist anddesigner.
Jerry Claiborne, 72, American football player and coach.
Marcel Lambert, 81, Canadian politician.
Jean Malléjac, 71, French bicycle racer.
Stephen McKeag, 30, Northern Irish loyalist, murdered.
Horacio Rivero Jr., 90, Puerto Rican four-star admiral.
Dean C. Strother, 92, US Air Force four-star general.

25
Tom Baker, 79, British Anglican priest.
Helmut Beck-Broichsitter, 86, German military police officer during World War II and neo-nazi.
Kayalakakam M. George, 77, Indian banker.
Tommy Reilly, 81, English musician.
Heberto Padilla, 68, Cuban poet.
R. S. Thomas, 87, Welsh poet.

26
Neva Abelson, 89, American research physician (co-discovered the blood test for the Rh blood factor).
Nick Fatool, 85, American jazz drummer.
Nat Fein, 86, American newspaper photographer.
Robert Lax, 84, American poet.
Richard Mulligan, 67, American actor (Soap, Empty Nest), cancer.
Baden Powell, 63, Brazilian guitarist.
Carl Sigman, 91, American songwriter.

27
Mario Arillo, 88, Italian naval officer during World War II.
Joshua Russell Chandran, 82, Indian Christian theologian.
David Jennens, 71, English rower.
Sammy Luftspring, 84, Canadian boxer.
Isaac Oceja, 85, Spanish football player and coach.
Eileen O'Connell, 53, Canadian politician, breast cancer.
Frank Wills, 52, American security, discovered Watergate break-in.

28
Peter Gennaro, 80, American dancer and choreographer (Annie).
V. E. Howard, 88, American minister and radio evangelist.
Manuel Martín Jr., 65, Cuban theatre director.
Roger Nott, 91, Australian politician.
Carlos Revilla, 67, Spanish voice actor, heart attack.
Pote Sarasin, 95, Thai diplomat and politician.
Pierre Trudeau, 80, Prime Minister of Canada.

29
Sir William Fry, 91, Australian politician.
John Grant, 67, British politician.
Lynn Lovenguth, 77, American baseball player.
Maningning Miclat, 28, Filipino poet and painter.
Bridget Plowden, Lady Plowden, 90, British educationalist.
Myles Ferguson, 19, Canadian actor.

30
Zoran Gopčević, 45, Yugoslav water polo player (silver medal winner in 1980 Summer Olympics).
Erno Paasilinna, 65, Finnish writer and journalist.
Sir Fred Pontin, 93, English businessman.
Joseph Weber, 81, American physicist.
Howard Winstone, 61, Welsh boxer.

References 

2000-09
 09